Joshua Bryan Lee (January 23, 1892August 10, 1967) was a United States representative and Senator from Oklahoma.

Early life
Lee was born in Childersburg, Alabama on January 23, 1892. He moved to Pauls Valley, Oklahoma (then Indian Territory), and Kiowa County, Oklahoma (near Hobart, Oklahoma) in 1901. He attended the public schools of Hobart and Rocky, Oklahoma and the Oklahoma Baptist University at Shawnee. He was a teacher in the public schools of Rocky from 1911 to 1913 and was a coach of athletics and teacher of public speaking at the Oklahoma Baptist University, 1913–1915; he graduated from the University of Oklahoma at Norman in 1917, and received a graduate degree in political science from Columbia University in 1924, and a law degree from Cumberland School of Law at Cumberland University (Tennessee) in 1925. He was initiated into the Mu chapter of Phi Mu Alpha Sinfonia music fraternity in 1917.

During the First World War, Joshua Lee served overseas as a private in the One Hundred and Thirty-fifth Infantry, Thirty-fourth Division, in 1917 and 1918. From 1919 to 1934, he was head of the public speaking department of the University of Oklahoma, and was also an author and lecturer. "HOW TO HOLD AN AUDIENCE WITHOUT A ROPE" and "THE BATTLE OF COGNAC" were his most noted titles.
"THE BATTLE OF COGNAC" was first published in October 1919 by "Harlow Publishing Corporation". It was republished as a hard cover in 1948 by Harlow Publishing Corporation with three more rhymes included. 
Besides the rhymes there is enough commentary to illuminate the circumstances in which the rhymes were written. The 1948 version was ill-trimmed and the pages were not separated in twenty four instances. It is made up of soldier rhymes, with no effort to make them poems. Josh called them "the jottings of a doughboy." One sample of his authentic jottings is this passage contributed by a man reporting for help at sick call. "Are you sick, soldier?"  And the trooper says, "No sir, I ain't sick, but I feels powful unnecessary down around my mess kit." Illustrations for the book were contributed by Ruth Monro Augar—from sketches she did during The First World War while serving as an El Paso Herald reporter—from scenes observed on the Texas border, near Fort Bliss.

During the latter part of the war, Lee joined the entertainment troop and soon became a favorite of battle-sick doughboys. He knew how they felt because he had been there, slogging through the same mud. By 1948, he owned and operated a ranch in western Oklahoma and a farm near Norman. His reputation in the neighborhood was that of just an all around good guy. Left in his personal papers were pictures of himself and FDR, about 100 copies of his "Cognac" book with the covers intact, and the pages still unopened. There were several recordings of material gleaned from his course in public speaking. There was also a picture of a painting of an early MacArthur, as well as pictures of himself at various functions.

There were three duffel bags full of correspondence and clippings of his public career that made the news. He and Will Rogers were close friends at one time. "Josh Lee never met a man he didn't like either," said Leroy Bridges, the Director of Outreach Political Communication Center, Department of Communication, at the University of Oklahoma. He is a treasure trove of information on the subject of Josh Lee and the times and people of the times.
  
From 1919 to 1934, Lee was head of the public speaking department of the University of Oklahoma, and was also an author and lecturer; he owned and operated a ranch in western Oklahoma and a farm near Norman.

Political career
He was elected as a Democrat to the Seventy-fourth Congress (January 3, 1935 – January 3, 1937) and was not a candidate for renomination in 1936; he was then elected as a Democrat to the United States Senate and served from January 3, 1937, to January 3, 1943. He was an unsuccessful candidate for reelection in 1942, and was a member of the Civil Aeronautics Board from 1943 to 1955. He returned to Norman and practiced law; he died there in 1967 and was interred in the I. O. O. F. Cemetery.

References

Josh B. Lee Collection and Photograph Collection at the Carl Albert Center

External links
 

|-

|-

|-

1892 births
1967 deaths
People from Childersburg, Alabama
Democratic Party members of the United States House of Representatives from Oklahoma
Democratic Party United States senators from Oklahoma
20th-century American politicians
People from Hobart, Oklahoma
University of Oklahoma alumni
Oklahoma Baptist University alumni
Columbia Graduate School of Arts and Sciences alumni
United States Army personnel of World War I
United States Army soldiers